D409 is a state road branching off from D8 state road connecting it to Split Airport and Trogir and Čiovo via D315. The road is 3.3 km long.

The road, as well as all other state roads in Croatia, is managed and maintained by Hrvatske ceste, state owned company.

Road junctions

Sources

See also
 Split Airport

State roads in Croatia
Transport in Split-Dalmatia County